The PlayStation controller is the first gamepad released by Sony Computer Entertainment for its PlayStation home video game console. The original version (model SCPH-1010) was released alongside the PlayStation on 3 December 1994.

Design 
Based on the basic button configuration established with Nintendo's Super NES Controller, the PlayStation controller added a second pair of shoulder buttons for the middle fingers. Intended to update the gamepad for navigating 3D environments such as the ones PlayStation was designed to generate, the concept behind featuring shoulder buttons for both the index and middle fingers was to implement two-way directional depth controls using the two sets of buttons. To compensate for the less stable grip from shifting the middle fingers' placement to the shoulders, grip handles were added to the controller.

Using the simple geometric shapes of a green triangle, a red circle, a blue cross, and a pink square to label its action buttons rather than traditionally used letters or numbers, the PlayStation controller established a trademark which would be incorporated heavily into the PlayStation brand. In an interview with Teiyu Goto, designer of the original PlayStation controller, he explained what the symbols mean: the circle and cross represent "yes" and "no", respectively (which explains their common use as "confirm" and "cancel" in games; this layout is reversed in Western games); the triangle symbolizes a point of view and the square is equated to a sheet of paper there to be used to access menus.

The PlayStation 2 console is backwards-compatible with the original PlayStation controller, with limited functionality due to a lack of analog sticks and pressure-sensitive buttons.

History 
Ken Kutaragi recounted the designing of the controller: 

Both Goto and Kutaragi recalled that Sony president Norio Ohga showed a special interest in the development of the controller, and strongly supported the final version.

On April 2, 1996 in Japan, Sony released a revised version of the PlayStation controller (model SCPH-1080), which is 10% larger than the launch model and features a longer cord with a ferrite bead. This model was bundled with all subsequent PlayStation consoles, including the North American and European launch models (which were already introduced a year prior in September 1995).

After briefly selling the Dual Analog Controller in 1997, Sony began phasing out the PlayStation controller later that year with the introduction of the DualShock controller, which would become the new standard controller for the PlayStation, although the first game to require its use, Ape Escape, would only be released two years later.

References

Game controllers
PlayStation (console) accessories